Plasmodium volans is a parasite of the genus Plasmodium subgenus Carinamoeba.

Like all Plasmodium species P. volans has both vertebrate and insect hosts. The vertebrate hosts for this parasite are reptiles.

Taxonomy 
The parasite was first described by Telford in 1995.

Description 
The schizonts produce 4 – 6 merozoites.

The gametocytes are elongated.

Distribution 
This species is found in the Philippines and Sarawak, Malaysia.

Hosts 
The only known host of this species is the flying lizard Draco volans.

References 

volans